The 2016 European Speed Skating Championships were held in Minsk, Belarus, from 9 to 10 January 2016. Skaters from 17 countries participated.

Sven Kramer and Ireen Wüst of the Netherlands were the defending champions. Kramer successfully defended his title, winning a record 8th title overall, and Martina Sáblíková of the Czech Republic won her 5th title.

Schedule
The schedule of events:

All times are FET (UTC+3).

Men's championships 

DNS = did not start, WDR = withdrew, DQ = disqualified

Day 1

500 metres

5000 metres

Day 2

1500 metres

10,000 metres

Final ranking

Women's championships

Day 1

500 metres

3000 metres

Day 2

1500 metres

5000 metres

Final ranking

See also
 2016 World Allround Speed Skating Championships

References 

European Championships
European Speed Skating Championships
Sports competitions in Minsk
2016 in Belarusian sport
International speed skating competitions hosted by Belarus